Tolani College of Commerce is a commerce college in Andheri East, Mumbai, India.

Introduction
Tolani College of Commerce was established in the year 1989 by Tolani Education Society to promote academic activities in the northeastern suburbs of Mumbai. The College is permanently affiliated to University of Mumbai and is recognized under section 2 (f) and 12 (B) of the University Grants Commission Act. The college is recognized by the Maharashtra State Board of Secondary and Higher Secondary Education for its junior college section. Tolani College of Commerce is one of the institutions of Andheri suburbs of Mumbai imparting commerce education. Dr. N.P. Tolani, the founder of this institution, has followed the ideals of his father, the late Shri Pribhadas.S. Tolani, a great educationist and philanthropist, who chose education as a field of activity and dedicated himself to it. Dr. N.P. Tolani has obtained his master's degree and Ph.D. degree from Cornell University, U.S. and majored in Agricultural Economics. He has been presented a citation naming him as among the foremost benefactors of Cornell University by Dean Susan Henry. His generous endowment to his alma mater led to the creation of Tolani senior professorship in International Trade Policy in the Department of Applied Economics and Management.

Tolani College of Commerce has been granted a minority status on linguistic (Sindhi) basis, by the Government of Maharashtra and University of Mumbai. Accordingly, for 50% of the seats, preference in admission is given to Sindhi students. Yet, students from the reserved categories and economically backward sections of the society are also encouraged to seek admission. In addition to this, students from all strata of society, irrespective of caste, creed, community, religion and financial background are also given admission, based on merit.

Besides the University related academic programmes the college carries out several Diploma and Certificate programmes which are relevant and employment oriented.

The National Assessment and Accreditation Council (NAAC) has accredited the College with a A++(5-star) rating.

Academics

Tolani College of Commerce offers the following courses:

Junior College
Higher Secondary Certificate (HSC) in Commerce

Under Graduate
Bachelor of Commerce (B.Com.)
B.Com. in Accounting and Finance (B.A.F.)
B.Com. in Banking and Insurance (B.B.I.)
Bachelor of Management Studies (B.M.S.)
Bachelor of Finance Marketing (B.F.M)
Bachelor of Science in Information Technology (BsciT)

Post Graduate
Master of Commerce (M.Com.) in Advanced Accounting
Master of Commerce (M.Com.) in Business Management

External links
 Tolani College of Commerce Website

Other Activitys :
 Weekly batches of SMU

See also
Tolani Maritime Institute

Universities and colleges in Mumbai
Commerce colleges in India
Affiliates of the University of Mumbai